Patrice Esnault (born 12 June 1961) is a French former professional racing cyclist. He rode in five editions of the Tour de France and four editions of the Vuelta a España.

References

External links
 

1961 births
Living people
French male cyclists
Sportspeople from Orléans
French Vuelta a España stage winners
Cyclists from Centre-Val de Loire